The Hittite / Luwian Karabel relief is a rock relief in the pass of the same name, between Torbalı and Kemalpaşa, about 20 km from Izmir in Turkey.  Rock reliefs are a prominent aspect of Hittite art.

Description 

The monument originally consisted of four parts: two ruler figures carved into the cliff (Karabel A and B) and two inscriptions on boulders (Karabel C1 and C2). During the construction of a road through the pass between 1977 and 1982, all the reliefs except for Karabel A were destroyed. Karabel A shows a warrior marching to the right with a bow in his right hand and a spear in his left. There are Luwian hieroglyphs inscribed above his left arm. The relief is 1.5 m wide and 2.5 m high

The Karabel relief was damaged by unknown persons, presumed to be treasure hunters, in early 2019.

Research history 
Herodotus interpreted the figure as the Egyptian Pharaoh Sesostris. The relief was visited by the French traveller Charles Texier in 1839 – he published a description in 1862. After him, Karl Richard Lepsius visited it in 1840. Both accepted it as Egyptian. Heinrich Kiepert disproved this in 1843 by comparing it with the reliefs of Yazılıkaya.  Subsequently, when the relief was accepted as Hittite, the place was visited and described by several scholars, including Kurt Bittel, Helmuth Theodor Bossert, Hans Gustav Güterbock, Ekrem Akurgal, Heinrich Otten and Annelies Kammenhuber.

Interpretation 
According to the latest research, the relief depicts Tarkasnawa, the king of the Hittite vassal state of Mira under the Hittite empire (13th century BC). In 1998 John David Hawkins was able to read the inscription as follows: 
 
No traces of the name of the grandfather survive, but other evidence indicates that it was Kubantaruntija.

The relief has wider historical significance as evidence that the kingdom of Mira was south of the Seha River Land. From Hittite diplomatic letters, chiefly the Milawata letter, it is known that the Seha River Land was bordered on one side by the kingdom of Mira and on the other side by Wilusa. The relief proves that Wilusa cannot have been south of the Gediz river, but must have been to the north of the river, in the Troad. This aids in the identification of Wilusa with the city of Ilion, another name for Troy in Homer's Iliad.

References

Bibliography 
 Birgit Brandau, Hartmut Schickert: Hethiter, die unbekannte Weltmacht. Piper, München 2001. 
 J. David Hawkins. "Tarkasnawa, King of Mira: 'Tarkondemos', Boğazköy sealings and Karabel," Anatolian Studies 48, 1998, pp. 1–31.
 Joachim Latacz: Troy and Homer: Towards a Solution of an Old Mystery Kevin Windle & Rosh Ireland (trans.). Oxford University Press.

External links 

 Description on www.hittitemonuments.com

Hittite art
Archaeological sites in the Aegean Region
Hittite sites in Turkey
Rock reliefs in Turkey
Luwian inscriptions
İzmir Province